Žatec is a town in Louny District in the Ústí nad Labem Region of the Czech Republic. It has about 19,000 inhabitants. It lies on the Ohře river. The town centre is well preserved and is protected by law as an urban monument reservation and partly as an urban monument zone.

Žatec is famous for an over-700-year-long tradition of growing Saaz noble hops used by several breweries.

Administrative parts
Villages of Bezděkov, Milčeves, Radíčeves, Trnovany, Velichov and Záhoří are administrative parts of Žatec.

Etymology
The name Žatec is derived from the Old Czech word záteč / zateč. It was a designation for a place on a river where ice accumulates in a narrowed channel.

Geography
It lies in an agricultural landscape of the Most Basin. The Ohře River flows through the town. The confluence of the rivers Ohře and Blšanka is situated on the eastern municipal border.

History

The first written mention of Žatec is in the Latin chronicle of Thietmar of Merseburg of 1004. In 1248, Žatec is firstly titled as a town. In 1265, it received the privileges of a royal town from King Ottokar II of Bohemia.

In the 16th century, Žatec had around 5,000 inhabitants and was one of the most populous towns in the kingdom. In 1827, a chain bridge over the Ohře, the first chain bridge in Bohemia, was built.

From the outbreak of the Hussite Wars in 1419 to the Thirty Years' War, the town was Hussite or Protestant, but after the Battle of White Mountain (1620) the greater part of the Czech inhabitants left the town. It remained German and Roman Catholic until 1945, when the German speaking inhabitants were expelled to Germany. On 3 June 1945, about 5,000 German inhabitants were gathered on the town square and marched to Postoloprty, where at least 763 were murdered, estimates range up to 2,000 victims killed by Czechoslovak military in Žatec and on the march.

Demographics

Economy
Žatec and its surroundings is known for its tradition of growing Saaz hops. Saaz hops or Žatec hops is a protected designation of origin.

The tradition of beer brewing started here in 1261, growing of hops is first documented in 1348. In 1800–1801, the Žatec Brewery started its production, which continues to this day.

Culture
Žatec hosts Dočesná, a hops-related harvest festival. It takes place on the town square every September.

Sights

Since 1961, the historic core of Žatec has been protected as an urban monument reservation. It is a collection of important buildings and architectural styles from the Romanesque period to the Art Nouveau.

Since 2003, the area south of the historic centre has been protected as an urban monument zone. It is valuable mainly for its technical constructions related to hop growing.

Church of the Assumption of the Virgin Mary is one of the most significant monuments. it was originally built in Romanesque style and some of its Romanesque parts are still preserved. In 1724–1728, the Chapel of Saint John of Nepomuk was added. Around 1740, the west façade was reconstructed into the Baroque style.

The hop-growing and brewing tradition is widely presented by the town. There are Hop Museum and Brewing Museum. The Temple of Hops and Beer is a tourist complex with several attractions, including a lookout tower and a small astronomical clock.

In popular culture
Žatec was used as a filming location for many historical films and TV series, including Yentl (1983), The Young Indiana Jones Chronicles (1992), Les Misérables (1998), The Scarlet Pimpernel (1999), Oliver Twist (1999), Burning Bush (2013), The Zookeeper's Wife (2016), A Bag of Marbles (2017) and Oscar-winning Jojo Rabbit (2019).

Notable people

Johannes von Tepl (c. 1350 – c. 1415), writer
Eugen Gura (1842–1906), German operatic baritone
Gabriel Anton (1858–1933), Austrian neurologist and psychiatrist
Adolf Strauss (1902–1944), pianist and composer
Maria Treben (1907–1991), Austrian author and herbalist
Karel Reiner (1910–1979), composer and pianist
Peter Glaser (1923–2014), Czech-American scientist and aerospace engineer
Zdeněk Svěrák (born 1936), actor, humorist and scriptwriter
Miroslav Varga (born 1960), sports shooter, Olympic winner
Jan Svěrák (born 1965), film director
Jaromír Zmrhal (born 1993), footballer

Twin towns – sister cities

Žatec is twinned with:
 Krasnystaw, Poland
 Poperinge, Belgium
 Thum, Germany
 Žalec, Slovenia

References

External links

Friends of Saaz/ Žatec (in German and English)
UNESCO on Žatec – the Hops Town

Cities and towns in the Czech Republic
Populated places in Louny District